Yuan Xue (born 25 January 1991) is a Chinese footballer who plays as a midfielder.

Club career
Having played in the lower leagues in China, Yuan became the first Chinese player to play in Montenegro, when he signed for FK Dečić in 2017. He went on to play in Spain with the 'B' team of FC Jumilla.

Career statistics

Club

Notes

References

1991 births
Living people
Chinese footballers
Association football midfielders
China League Two players
Shenzhen Fengpeng F.C. players
Yunnan Flying Tigers F.C. players
Hunan Billows F.C. players
FK Radnik Surdulica players
FK Dečić players
FC Jumilla players
Chinese expatriate footballers
Chinese expatriate sportspeople in Serbia
Expatriate footballers in Serbia
Expatriate footballers in Montenegro
Chinese expatriate sportspeople in Spain
Expatriate footballers in Spain